The Greek Food Festival of Dallas is a food festival held annually in Dallas, Texas (USA), featuring traditional Greek cuisine and Greek culture.  

The Festival was first held in Dallas in 1956 and having celebrated its 50th anniversary in 2006, the Greek Food Festival has grown into an event of national importance, featuring the best of Greek dinners, homemade pastries, wines, Greek music and dances. In addition to this, the spectators have a chance to learn more of Greek history and culture and enjoy cooking demonstrations from Dallas chefs. There was no festival in 2020 as the COVID-19 pandemic was to blame; the 65th is deferred to 2021.

Like the majority of Greek festivals, which are organized by the Greek Orthodox Church, recognized as the center of cultural activities of the Greek community, Greek Food Festival of Dallas is also organized by the Holy Trinity Greek Orthodox Church.

See also
 Food festival
 Posen Potato Festival
 Puerto Vallarta festival
 Howell Melon Festival
 Gilroy Garlic Festival
 Brentwood Cornfest
 Castroville Artichoke Festival

References 
 Official Arthichoke Festival web site
 Information on Artichokes Growing in Monterey County, California
 Castroville Artichoke Festival Information

External links
 The Official Greek Festival of Dallas Web Site
 The Holy Trinity Greek Orthodox Church Information
 Information on Various Greek Food Festivals

Festivals in Dallas
Food and drink festivals in the United States
Greek festivals
Greek-American cuisine
Greek-American culture in Texas